is a railway station on the Keio New Line in the Hatagaya district of Shibuya, Tokyo, Japan, operated by the private railway operator Keio Corporation.

Station layout
Both platforms are two floors underground with side platforms on either side of the two central tracks.

Platforms

History
Hatagaya Station opened on 11 October 1913. The station was moved to its present underground location on 1 November 1978.

References

External links

 Hatagaya station information 

Keio New Line
Stations of Keio Corporation
Railway stations in Tokyo
Railway stations in Japan opened in 1913